Baek Jong-Chul (or  ; born on March 9, 1961) is a former South Korea football player. He was top scorer of 1984 K-League campaign. He is currently manager of Daegu FC.

Honors and awards

Player
Hyundai Horangi
 League Cup Winners (2) : 1986

Individual
 K League Regular Season Top Scorer Award (1): 1984
 K League Best XI (1) : 1984

References

Legends of K-League : Baek Jong-Chul

External links
 

1961 births
Living people
Association football forwards
South Korean footballers
South Korean football managers
South Korea international footballers
Ulsan Hyundai FC players
Seongnam FC players
K League 1 players
Kyung Hee University alumni
Daegu FC managers